Trillium ovatum, the Pacific trillium, also known as the western wakerobin, western white trillium, or western trillium, is a species of flowering plant in the family Melanthiaceae. It is found in western North America, from southern British Columbia and the tip of southwestern Alberta to central California, east to Idaho and western Montana. There is an isolated population in northern Colorado and southern Wyoming.

T. ovatum is the most widespread and abundant trillium in western North America. It is the only pedicellate-flowered Trillium species found within its range. The type specimen for this species was gathered by Meriwether Lewis in 1806 along the Columbia River during the return trip of the Lewis and Clark Expedition.

Description
The most widespread of the western North American trilliums, Trillium ovatum varies greatly within its range. Despite this, T. ovatum closely resembles the eastern T. grandiflorum. Apart from geographic location, the two species are not easily distinguished.

T. ovatum is a perennial herbaceous plant that spreads by means of underground rhizomes. At maturity, each plant has one or two flowering scapes, each  in length. The specific epithet ovatum means “egg-shaped,” which refers to the petals, not the leaves.

The flower sits on a pedicel  in length. Typically the flower opens white and becomes pink with age, but in the Smith River Canyon area of northern California and southern Oregon, the petals become almost barn-red.

Taxonomy
In addition to Trillium ovatum Pursh, the following infraspecific taxa are accepted by the World Checklist of Selected Plant Families:
 
 Trillium ovatum var. oettingeri 
 Trillium ovatum var. ovatum

The variety T. o. var. oettingeri is endemic to the Salmon Mountains of northwestern California and hence Oettinger's trillium is known as the Salmon Mountains wakerobin. Unlike the nominate variety T. o. var. ovatum, the variety oettingeri has leaves with short petioles and linear flower petals.

Trillium ovatum f. maculosum  refers to a form with mottled leaves that occurs in Mendocino County, California. This is the only reported instance of mottled leaves in a pedicellate Trillium.

Despite its provenance, T. hibbersonii is no longer thought to be related to T. ovatum.

Habitat and ecology
Trillium ovatum is often found growing in coniferous and mixed coniferous-deciduous forests, in and around alder thickets and shrubs. Along the California coast, it is commonly found under coast redwood and mixed evergreen forest. At Lolo Pass, Montana, it grows under spruce and Douglas fir in ravines along mountain streams.

Flowers bloom late February in the southern part of its range, and in March or April elsewhere. Citizen science observations of flowering plants of this species peak during the first week of April. For comparison, when Trillium grandiflorum is fully open in eastern North America, T. ovatum is already fading in western North America. Apparently T. ovatum lacks sufficient winter hardiness to flourish east of the continental divide.

The life-cycle stages of T. ovatum include a cotyledon stage, a one-leaf vegetative stage, a three-leaf vegetative (juvenile) stage, a three-leaf reproductive (flowering) stage, and a three-leaf nonflowering regressive stage. An example of the latter involves a transition from the three-leaf flowering stage to a three-leaf nonflowering regressive stage. Approximately one of every four reproductive plants regresses to a nonflowering state in any given year. Under the right conditions, individuals may undergo extended dormancy, that is, they may cease above-ground growth for one or more years. In western Montana, dormancy was observed in all adult stage classes, with most plants returning to above ground status in a year or two, although some plants exhibited dormancy for 3–5 years.

Bibliography

References

External links

Trillium and the Trillium family

ovatum
Ephemeral plants
Flora of the Western United States
Plants described in 1813
Taxa named by Frederick Traugott Pursh
Garden plants of North America